Marco Lukka (born 4 December 1996) is an Estonian professional footballer who plays as a left back for Meistriliiga club Flora and the Estonia national team.

International career
Lukka made his senior international debut for Estonia on 5 September 2021, in a 0–1 home loss to Northern Ireland.

Honours

Club
Flora
Meistriliiga: 2020, 2020
Estonian Cup: 2019–20

References

External links

1996 births
Living people
Sportspeople from Pärnu
Estonian footballers
Association football defenders
Esiliiga players
Pärnu JK Vaprus players
Meistriliiga players
FC Flora players
JK Tallinna Kalev players
FC Kuressaare players
Kakkonen players
SJK Akatemia players
Estonia youth international footballers
Estonia under-21 international footballers
Estonia international footballers
Expatriate footballers in Finland
Estonian expatriate sportspeople in Finland